Ferruccio Tagliavini (14 August 191329 January 1995) was an Italian operatic tenor mainly active in the 1940s and 1950s. Tagliavini was hailed as the heir apparent to Tito Schipa and Beniamino Gigli in the lyric-opera repertory due to the exceptional beauty of his voice, but he did not sustain his great early promise across the full span of his career.

Career
Tagliavini was born in Cavazzoli, Reggio Emilia and studied in Parma with Italo Brancucci and in Florence and with Amedeo Bassi, a well-known dramatic verismo and Wagnerian Italian tenor of the pre-World War I era whose voice (as recorded) could not be more unlike Tagliavini's (see M.Scott, The Record of Singing, 1978). It was also in Florence that he made his professional debut in 1938 as Rodolfo in La bohème.

He swiftly gained recognition as one of the leading tenori di grazia of his time in operas such as The Barber of Seville, L'elisir d'amore, Don Pasquale, La sonnambula, Lucia di Lammermoor, Rigoletto, La traviata, Manon, Werther, L'amico Fritz and L'arlesiana.

Debuts at many of the world's major opera houses ensued. They included: La Scala, Milan, in 1942; the Teatro Colón, Buenos Aires, in 1946; the Metropolitan Opera, New York City, in 1947 (as Rodolfo in La bohème); the San Francisco Opera in 1948; the Royal Opera House, Covent Garden, London, in 1950; and, finally, the Paris Opéra in 1951.

During the 1950s, Tagliavini took on heavier roles such as Riccardo in Un ballo in maschera, Cavaradossi in Tosca and Faust in Mefistofele; but the lyric quality of his voice suffered as a consequence.

Tagliavini retired from the stage in 1965; he continued, however, to give occasional recitals until the mid-1970s. He left behind an impressive discography. The finest of his recordings are those that he made of operatic arias during his prime in the 1940s and early 1950s. In these records one can fully appreciate his remarkable skill at soft, or mezza voce,  singing. He also appeared in a few opera films, notably Il barbiere di Siviglia in 1946 with Tito Gobbi and Italo Tajo.

Tagliavini married the soprano Pia Tassinari in 1941. He made several recordings with her and they appeared together often on stage. There is a recording available of them singing Massenet's opera Werther.

He died in Reggio Emilia in 1995, aged 81.

Selected studio recordings

 1939 - Mozart - Requiem, KV 626 - Ferruccio Tagliavini, Pia Tassinari, Ebe Stignani - Coro e Orchestra della Rai Torino, Victor de Sabata
 1941 - Mascagni - L'amico Fritz - Ferruccio Tagliavini, Pia Tassinari, Saturno Meletti - Coro e Orchestra della Rai Torino, Pietro Mascagni
 1952 - Bellini - La sonnambula - Lina Pagliughi, Ferruccio Tagliavini, Cesare Siepi - Coro Cetra, Orchestra della Rai Torino, Franco Capuana
 1952 - Puccini - La bohème - Rosanna Carteri, Ferruccio Tagliavini, Elvina Ramella, Giuseppe Taddei, Cesare Siepi, Pier Luigi Latinucci - Coro e Orchestra della Rai Torino, Gabriele Santini
 1954 - Puccini - Madama Butterfly - Clara Petrella, Ferruccio Tagliavini, Mafalda Masini, Giuseppe Taddei - Coro Cetra, Orchestra della Rai Torino, Angelo Questa
 1954 - Verdi - Rigoletto - Giuseppe Taddei, Lina Pagliughi, Ferruccio Tagliavini, Giulio Neri - Coro e Orchestra della Rai Torino, Angelo Questa
 1954 - Verdi - Un ballo in maschera - Mary Curtis Verna, Ferruccio Tagliavini, Giuseppe Valdengo, Pia Tassinari, Maria Erato - Coro e Orchestra della Rai Torino, Angelo Questa
 1954 - Massenet - Werther - Ferruccio Tagliavini, Pia Tassinari, Vittoria Neviani, Marcello Cortis - Coro e Orchestra della Rai Torino, Francesco Molinari-Pradelli
 1955 - Cilea - L'Arlesiana - Pia Tassinari, Ferruccio Tagliavini, Paolo Silveri, Gianna Galli - Coro e Orchestra della Rai Torino, Arturo Basile
 1955 - Von Flotow - Martha - Elena Rizzieri, Ferruccio Tagliavini, Pia Tassinari, Carlo Tagliabue - Coro e Orchestra della Rai Torino, Francesco Molinari-Pradelli (sung in Italian)
 1956 - Boito - Mefistofele - Giulio Neri, Ferruccio Tagliavini, Marcella Pobbé - Coro Teatro Regio Torino, Orchestra della Rai Torino, Angelo Questa
 1956 - Puccini - Tosca - Gigliola Frazzoni, Ferruccio Tagliavini, Giangiacomo Guelfi - Coro e Orchestra della Rai Torino, Arturo Basile
 1959 - Donizetti - Lucia di Lammermoor - Maria Callas, Ferruccio Tagliavini, Piero Cappuccilli - Philharmonia Chorus & Orchestra, Tullio Serafin

Filmography 
 Voglio vivere così (1941)
 La donna è mobile (1942)
 Anything for a Song (1943)
 The Barber of Seville (1947)
 Al diavolo la celebrità (1949)
 I cadetti di Guascogna (1950)
 Anema e core (1951)
 Vento di primavera (1959)

Sources 

 The Metropolitan Opera Encyclopedia, edited by David Hamilton,  (Simon and Schuster, 1987). 
 Guide de l’opéra, Roland Mancini & Jean-Jacques Rouvereux,  (Fayard, 1995). 
 The Concise Oxford Dictionary of Opera (Second Edition), Harold Rosenthal and John Warrack, (Oxford University Press, 1980).

External links
 History of the Tenor / Ferruccio Tagliavini / Sound Clips and Narration

Footnotes 

1913 births
1995 deaths
Italian operatic tenors
People from the Province of Reggio Emilia
20th-century Italian male opera singers